Ihor Ivanovych Tuhay (born 22 March 1975) is a hammer thrower from Ukraine. His personal best throw is 79.46 metres, achieved in July 2008 in Kyiv.

Achievements

References

sports-reference

1975 births
Living people
Ukrainian male hammer throwers
Athletes (track and field) at the 2008 Summer Olympics
Olympic athletes of Ukraine